The year 1822 in architecture involved some significant events.

Buildings and structures

Buildings completed

 Piazza del Popolo, Rome, by Giuseppe Valadier, completed.
 Saint David's Building, the original home of St David's College, Lampeter, Wales, by Charles Cockerell.
 Reconstruction and new prison buildings at Chester Castle, England, by Thomas Harrison.
 St Pancras New Church, London, by William and Henry William Inwood.
 Kalupur Swaminarayan Mandir, Ahmedabad, British Raj.
 Assembly Rooms, Aberdeen, Scotland, by Archibald Simpson.
 Second Chestnut Street Theatre, Philadelphia, United States, by William Strickland.
 Main building of Government Palace (Finland) in Helsinki Senate Square, by Carl Ludvig Engel.
 Façade of Register House, Princes Street, Edinburgh, Scotland, by Robert Reid.
 Reconstruction of Royal Pavilion, Brighton, England by John Nash.
 Yelagin Palace, Saint Petersburg, by Carlo Rossi.
 Cartland Bridge, Scotland, by Thomas Telford.
 Pont de pierre (Bordeaux), by Jean-Baptiste Billaudel and Claude Deschamps.

Awards
 Grand Prix de Rome, architecture: Émile Gilbert.

Births
 January 9 – Carol Benesch, Silesian and Romanian architect (died 1896)
 April 26 – Frederick Law Olmsted, American landscape architect (died 1903)
 September 12 – Philip Charles Hardwick, English architect (died 1892)
 December 6 – David Stirling, Scottish-born Dominion architect for federal works in Nova Scotia (died 1887)
 December – Frank Wills, English-born architect working in North America (died 1857)

Deaths
 John Bowden, Irish ecclesiastical architect
 Luigi Rusca, Swiss architect working in Russia (born 1762)

References

Architecture
Years in architecture
19th-century architecture